Schatzenstein is a mountain of Saxony, southeastern Germany. It is located northwest of Elterlein at the municipal boundary to Zwönitz and Grünhain-Beierfeld on a local watershed which divides the drainage basins of Zwönitz river and Schwarzwasser. Several phyllite cliffs of up to 10 m height are exposed in the vicinity of the mountain.

A marker of the Royal Saxon triangulation campaign of 1862 to 1890 stands on the summit of Schatzenstein. Beneath it, a commemorative plaque for the forester and poet Max Schreyer is mounted to the rock.

Mountains of Saxony
Mountains of the Ore Mountains